Vestbanen Moraine is a medial moraine in Humboldt Graben, originating near Zwiesel Mountain and trending north in string-like fashion for 13 miles (21 km) along the west flank of the Petermann Ranges, Wohlthat Mountains. First plotted from air photos by German Antarctic Expedition, 1938–39. Remapped by Norwegian Antarctic Expedition, 1956–60, and named "Vestbanen" ("the west path"). The feature is similar to Austbanen Moraine which parallels it 7 miles (11 km) eastward.

Moraines of Queen Maud Land
Princess Astrid Coast